The Eight Men was a group of eight residents chosen by the people of New Netherland in 1643 to advise its Director-General, Willem Kieft, on his governance of the colony. An early form of representational democracy in colonial North America, it replaced the similarly selected Twelve Men and was followed by the Nine Men.

Council
In 1643 Abraham Pietersen Van Deusen, who had served on the council of the Twelve Men, was appointed to a new body of eight men. The group contacted the Estates-General of the Netherlands and blamed governor Willem Kieft for the declining economic condition of the nascent colony, and Kieft's War with the Native Americans. They requested that a new Director-General of New Netherland be appointed, and that the people be given more influence in the new government. Director-General Kieft was dismissed and replaced by Peter Stuyvesant. Kieft left for Holland in September 1647 to defend himself to the Estates-General, but the Princess Amelia was lost at sea and his body was never recovered. Stuyvesant remained in power until the colony was turned over to the British in 1664. 

John Franklin Jameson (1859–1937) wrote of the Eight Men:
The commonalty were called together; they were sore distressed. They chose eight, instead of the previous twelve, persons to aid in consulting for the best; but the occupation every one had to take care of his own, prevented anything beneficial being adopted at that time. nevertheless it was resolved that as many Englishmen as were to be got in the country should be enlisted, who were indeed now proposing to depart; the third part of these were to be paid by the commonalty; this promise was made by the commonalty but was not followed by the pay.

Council Members
The council members were:
 Isaac Allerton
 Jan Jansen Dam, who was replaced by Jan Everts Bout
 Barent Dircksen
 Oloff Stevense Van Cortlandt
 Thomas Hal, sometimes spelled as Thomas Hall
 Jochem Pietersen Kuyter
 Cornelis Melyn, was chairman
 Abraham Pietersen Van Deursen
 Wolphert Gerretse Van Kouwenhoven
 Captain John Underhill, appointed in 1645

See also
Adriaen van der Donck
Schepen
Schout
Burgomaster
Voorleser

References

Further reading
Benson John Lossing; The Empire State: A Compendious History of the Commonwealth of New York

Octets
New Netherland
People of New Netherland
History of Jersey City, New Jersey